Chernihiv railway station is the main train station in Chernihiv, Ukraine.

The first station was built in 1893. During the World War II, like many buildings in Chernihiv, the building of the railway station was destroyed.

The current building was built in 1948 by the project of the architect , and the station was opened in 1950. Today the Chernihiv railway station is one of the most important railway junctions of the Southwestern Railways.

Gallery

References

Railway stations in Chernihiv Oblast
Railway stations opened in 1893